Anne Cassin (born 1969) is an Irish journalist and news presenter working for Raidió Teilifís Éireann (RTÉ).

Cassin began her broadcasting career working for Dublin pirate radio station Radio Nova in 1982, where she co-presented a nightly news programme, Dublin Today, with Bryan Dobson, later a fellow newscaster on RTÉ. In 1993, she presented Eurofocus, a RTÉ series on studies of education in European countries. She began presenting radio and television news bulletins for RTÉ in 1995 and has also covered current affairs, politics and sport as a reporter and on The Sunday Game circa (1991-1995).

Cassin has also presented various non-news programmes including the weekly Dublin-based feature series Capital D, Crimecall and The All Island School Choir Competition. On 20 December 2011, she was named as the new co-presenter of Nationwide, replacing Michael Ryan. Her first Nationwide broadcast occurred on Friday the 13th of January 2012.

Personal life 
Cassin is the eldest daughter of actor and director Barry Cassin, and Nancy. She was educated at Loreto Convent, Balbriggan, Co. Dublin. Cassin has two children with her partner and RTÉ colleague Donagh McGrath.

References

Living people
20th-century Irish people
Irish radio presenters
Irish women radio presenters
Irish women television presenters
Irish women journalists
Irish sports broadcasters
RTÉ newsreaders and journalists
RTÉ television presenters
1949 births
21st-century Irish journalists